Cukai is a state constituency in Terengganu, Malaysia. It is currently represented in the Terengganu State Legislative Assembly.

History

References

Terengganu state constituencies